Mary Bassett may refer to:
 Mary T. Bassett, health commissioner and professor of clinical epidemiology
 Mary R. Bassett, illustrator of magazines and children's books
 Mary Bassett Clarke (1831–1908), née Bassett, American writer.

See also
 Mary Basset (c. 1523 –1572), translator of works into the English language
 Mary Imogene Bassett Hospital